Paul Di Bella  (born 12 February 1977 in Queensland) is an Australian sprinter, who competed for his nation as part of the Australian Men's 4 × 100 metres relay team at the 2000 Summer Olympics and the team at the 2004 Summer Olympics.

References

External links

Australian male sprinters
Olympic athletes of Australia
Athletes (track and field) at the 2000 Summer Olympics
Athletes (track and field) at the 2004 Summer Olympics
Commonwealth Games medallists in athletics
People from Queensland
1977 births
Living people
Commonwealth Games bronze medallists for Australia
Goodwill Games medalists in athletics
Athletes (track and field) at the 2002 Commonwealth Games
Competitors at the 2001 Goodwill Games
Medallists at the 2002 Commonwealth Games